The men's javelin throw competition at the 2018 Asian Games took place on 27 August 2018 at the Gelora Bung Karno Stadium.

Schedule
All times are Western Indonesia Time (UTC+07:00)

Records

Results

References

External links
Results

Men's javelin throw
2018 Men